Huang Lanxiang (born February 1962) is a Chinese politician who since 2015 has served as a vice governor of the Hunan Provincial Party Committee in China.

Biography
Huang was born in 1962, in Liling, Hunan. After having studied mathematics at Hunan Normal University she joined the Communist Party of China and graduated with a master's degree in public administration from the Central Party School of the Communist Party of China. In 1991 she was assigned as the secretary of the Zhuzhou Youth League committee and later served in the same role for the CPC in the North district and Shifeng district's of Zhuzhou. A few years later in 1996, Huang enrolled at the Chinese Academy of Social Sciences where she majored in International Trade before being appointed the vice chairman of the Hunan Women's Federation Party Group, the secretary of CPC Shifeng District Committee of Zhuzhou and director of the standing committee of People's Congress of Shifeng District.

In 2013 Huang was promoted to the position of vice governor of the Hunan Provincial People's Government where in her role she worked in the division of labor department. Two years later she joined her most senior role yet as a Hunan Provincial Party Committee.

References

1962 births
Living people
Central Party School of the Chinese Communist Party alumni
Peking University alumni
21st-century Chinese women politicians
21st-century Chinese politicians
Politicians from Zhuzhou
People's Republic of China politicians from Hunan
Chinese Communist Party politicians from Hunan
Political office-holders in Hunan